Petrykivka is an urban-type settlement in Dnipro Raion, Dnipropetrovsk Oblast (province) in east-central Ukraine. It hosts the administration of Petrykivka settlement hromada, one of the hromadas of Ukraine. Population: . 

Petrykivka is famous as a folk art centre and for its unique style of decorative painting, which is inscribed by UNESCO as significant Intangible Cultural Heritage of Ukraine.

History
According to a legend, the settlement was founded by the Cossack Petryk, who gathered under his protection the serfs from the local villages.

Petrykivka was first mentioned in historical documents in 1772, when the residents of neighbouring  Kurylivka village asked Kosh Otaman Petro Kalnyshevsky to move their Orthodox Chapel to a safer place because of flooding. According to that request, the wooden church was moved to Petrykivka.

During World War II the town was conquered by Italian troops.

Until the raion was abolished on 18 July 2020, Petrykivka was the administrative center of Petrykivka Raion. After that date the village became part of Dnipro Raion.

References

Urban-type settlements in Dnipro Raion